The 1973 Virginia Slims of Denver, also known by its sponsored name Denver Majestic Tournament,  was a women's tennis tournament played on hard court at the South High School in Denver, Colorado in the United States that was part of the 1973 Virginia Slims World Championship Series. It was the second edition of the tournament and was held from July 30 through August 5, 1973. First-seeded Billie Jean King won the singles title and earned $7,000 first-prize money. Total attendance for the event was 22,800 which made it the first women's-only tournament to have an attendance of more than 20,000.

Finals

Singles
 Billie Jean King defeated  Betty Stöve 6–4, 6–2
 It was King's 6th title of the year and the 103rd of her career.

Doubles
 Rosemary Casals /  Billie Jean King vs.  Françoise Dürr /  Betty Stöve 3–2 match abandoned due to rain, prize shared

Prize money

See also
 1973 Denver WCT

References

Virginia Slims of Denver
Virginia Slims of Denver
Virgin
Virginia Slims of Denver
Virginia Slims of Denver
Virginia Slims of Denver